Lincoln Township may refer to:

Arkansas 
 Lincoln Township, Madison County, Arkansas
 Lincoln Township, Newton County, Arkansas, in Newton County, Arkansas
 Lincoln Township, Washington County, Arkansas

Illinois 
 Lincoln Township, Ogle County, Illinois

Indiana 
 Lincoln Township, Hendricks County, Indiana
 Lincoln Township, LaPorte County, Indiana
 Lincoln Township, Newton County, Indiana
 Lincoln Township, St. Joseph County, Indiana
 Lincoln Township, White County, Indiana

Iowa 
 Lincoln Township, Adair County, Iowa
 Lincoln Township, Adams County, Iowa
 Lincoln Township, Appanoose County, Iowa
 Lincoln Township, Audubon County, Iowa
 Lincoln Township, Black Hawk County, Iowa
 Lincoln Township, Buena Vista County, Iowa
 Lincoln Township, Calhoun County, Iowa
 Lincoln Township, Cass County, Iowa
 Lincoln Township, Cerro Gordo County, Iowa
 Lincoln Township, Clay County, Iowa
 Lincoln Township, Dallas County, Iowa
 Lincoln Township, Emmet County, Iowa
 Lincoln Township, Grundy County, Iowa
 Lincoln Township, Hamilton County, Iowa
 Lincoln Township, Harrison County, Iowa
 Lincoln Township, Iowa County, Iowa
 Lincoln Township, Johnson County, Iowa
 Lincoln Township, Kossuth County, Iowa
 Lincoln Township, Lucas County, Iowa
 Lincoln Township, Madison County, Iowa, in Madison County, Iowa
 Lincoln Township, Mahaska County, Iowa
 Lincoln Township, Monona County, Iowa
 Lincoln Township, Montgomery County, Iowa
 Lincoln Township, O'Brien County, Iowa, in O'Brien County, Iowa
 Lincoln Township, Page County, Iowa
 Lincoln Township, Plymouth County, Iowa
 Lincoln Township, Pocahontas County, Iowa
 Lincoln Township, Polk County, Iowa
 Lincoln Township, Pottawattamie County, Iowa
 Lincoln Township, Poweshiek County, Iowa
 Lincoln Township, Ringgold County, Iowa
 Lincoln Township, Scott County, Iowa
 Lincoln Township, Shelby County, Iowa, in Shelby County, Iowa
 Lincoln Township, Sioux County, Iowa
 Lincoln Township, Story County, Iowa
 Lincoln Township, Tama County, Iowa
 Lincoln Township, Union County, Iowa, in Union County, Iowa
 Lincoln Township, Warren County, Iowa, in Warren County, Iowa
 Lincoln Township, Winnebago County, Iowa
 Lincoln Township, Winneshiek County, Iowa, in Winneshiek County, Iowa
 Lincoln Township, Worth County, Iowa
 Lincoln Township, Wright County, Iowa

Kansas 
 Lincoln Township, Anderson County, Kansas
 Lincoln Township, Butler County, Kansas
 Lincoln Township, Cloud County, Kansas
 Lincoln Township, Coffey County, Kansas
 Lincoln Township, Crawford County, Kansas
 Lincoln Township, Decatur County, Kansas
 Lincoln Township, Dickinson County, Kansas
 Lincoln Township, Edwards County, Kansas
 Lincoln Township, Ellsworth County, Kansas
 Lincoln Township, Franklin County, Kansas
 Lincoln Township, Grant County, Kansas
 Lincoln Township, Jackson County, Kansas
 Lincoln Township, Linn County, Kansas, in Linn County, Kansas
 Lincoln Township, Marshall County, Kansas, in Marshall County, Kansas
 Lincoln Township, Neosho County, Kansas
 Lincoln Township, Osage County, Kansas, in Osage County, Kansas
 Lincoln Township, Ottawa County, Kansas, in Ottawa County, Kansas
 Lincoln Township, Pawnee County, Kansas, in Pawnee County, Kansas
 Lincoln Township, Pottawatomie County, Kansas, in Pottawatomie County, Kansas
 Lincoln Township, Reno County, Kansas, in Reno County, Kansas
 Lincoln Township, Republic County, Kansas
 Lincoln Township, Rice County, Kansas
 Lincoln Township, Russell County, Kansas
 Lincoln Township, Sedgwick County, Kansas
 Lincoln Township, Sherman County, Kansas
 Lincoln Township, Smith County, Kansas, in Smith County, Kansas
 Lincoln Township, Stafford County, Kansas, in Stafford County, Kansas
 Lincoln Township, Washington County, Kansas, in Washington County, Kansas

Michigan 
 Lincoln Charter Township, Michigan, in Berrien County
 Lincoln Township, Arenac County, Michigan
 Lincoln Township, Clare County, Michigan
 Lincoln Township, Huron County, Michigan
 Lincoln Township, Isabella County, Michigan
 Lincoln Township, Midland County, Michigan
 Lincoln Township, Newaygo County, Michigan
 Lincoln Township, Osceola County, Michigan

Minnesota 
 Lincoln Township, Blue Earth County, Minnesota
 Lincoln Township, Marshall County, Minnesota

Missouri 
 Lincoln Township, Andrew County, Missouri
 Lincoln Township, Atchison County, Missouri
 Lincoln Township, Caldwell County, Missouri
 Lincoln Township, Christian County, Missouri
 Lincoln Township, Clark County, Missouri
 Lincoln Township, Dallas County, Missouri
 Lincoln Township, Daviess County, Missouri
 Lincoln Township, Douglas County, Missouri, in Douglas County, Missouri
 Lincoln Township, Grundy County, Missouri
 Lincoln Township, Harrison County, Missouri
 Lincoln Township, Holt County, Missouri, in Holt County, Missouri
 Lincoln Township, Jasper County, Missouri
 Lincoln Township, Lawrence County, Missouri
 Lincoln Township, Nodaway County, Missouri
 Lincoln Township, Putnam County, Missouri, in Putnam County, Missouri
 Lincoln Township, Stone County, Missouri

Nebraska 
 Lincoln Township, Antelope County, Nebraska
 Lincoln Township, Cuming County, Nebraska
 Lincoln Township, Gage County, Nebraska
 Lincoln Township, Kearney County, Nebraska
 Lincoln Township, Knox County, Nebraska

North Dakota 
 Lincoln Township, Emmons County, North Dakota
 Lincoln Township, Pembina County, North Dakota, in Pembina County, North Dakota

Ohio 
 Lincoln Township, Morrow County, Ohio

Pennsylvania 
 Lincoln Township, Bedford County, Pennsylvania
 Lincoln Township, Huntingdon County, Pennsylvania
 Lincoln Township, Somerset County, Pennsylvania

South Dakota 
 Lincoln Township, Brown County, South Dakota, in Brown County, South Dakota
 Lincoln Township, Clark County, South Dakota, in Clark County, South Dakota
 Lincoln Township, Douglas County, South Dakota, in Douglas County, South Dakota
 Lincoln Township, Lincoln County, South Dakota, in Lincoln County, South Dakota
 Lincoln Township, Perkins County, South Dakota
 Lincoln Township, Spink County, South Dakota, in Spink County, South Dakota
 Lincoln Township, Tripp County, South Dakota, in Tripp County, South Dakota

Township name disambiguation pages